The privateer brig Admiral Juel was the second largest ship in Denmark-Norway to be granted letters of marque during the Gunboat War between Denmark and Britain. The British Royal Navy captured her in a notable single ship action in 1808.

Background
The 1807 British attack on Copenhagen by land and sea left Denmark with few warships and poor options in continuing the fight with her new enemy. The ship-of-the-line  and a handful of brigs were (temporarily) safe in Norwegian ports, and the squadrons of gunboats elsewhere on the coast were primarily for defence.

Within one week of the British forces departing with the remains of the Danish fleet, King Christian VII's government in Copenhagen promulgated the Danish Privateers Regulations (1807). Denmark was at war with Britain, and a part of the fight would fall to privateers.

Denmark and Norway issued Kaperbrev (letters of marque).

From 1807 to 1813 Danish shipping companies donated suitable ships (brigs, schooners and galleases) to the state which could then equip the ships for their new privateering role. One such ship was the brig Admiral Juel.
Danish privateers were an important tactical weapon in the furtherance of the war. They were not on an equal footing with the British men-of-war but by forcing British merchant ships to follow a convoy system for protection fewer warships were available for active warfare against Denmark.

Admiral Juel
Three Danish merchant ships afloat in 1807 were named Admiral Juel or Admiral N Juel. All three received letters of marque from the Danish authorities, but only one was a brig. The ships were named for the seventeenth century Danish admiral Niels Juel. It is worth emphasising that no ship of this name is recorded as being in the Royal Danish Navy, although four more recent naval ships have been named Niels Juel - nor is her appointed captain Jørgen Jørgensen listed as a Danish naval officer.

Events
In September 1807 the brewer and captain Jens Lind & partners of Copenhagen acquired the brig Christine Henriette, a French-built merchant ship, and presented her to the state for converting and equipping as a privateer of 28 cannon, and a crew of 91. Jens Lind and partners also invested in another three privateers being equipped at Helsingør by a younger namesake of Jens Lind. On completion of her refit Christine Henriette was renamed Admiral Juel. At 170 tons (bm), the ship was the second largest in the whole of the Danish privateer fleet.

On 4 December 1807 Jørgen Jørgensen was in audience with Crown Prince Frederik and with a little ceremony was granted command of the refitted Admiral Juel. He was awarded a letter of marque and made to swear to respect the rules for privateering that had been formulated a few months earlier. Jörgensen's seamanship and international experience weighed heavily in this decision and rumours of his incorrect political views were discounted.

Impatient to be actively at sea, Jörgensen had his crew break the ice which kept so many ships inactive and sailed out. So early in the season, privateers were not expected and Admiral Juel quickly captured three vessels and brought them back to Copenhagen, where they were greeted with much jubilation.
Sally of London, an English merchant ship
Flyvefisken, a Swedish herring boat
Spring, of Danzig, a Prussian merchant ship 
Winter ice reasserted its hold on the harbours of Denmark and it was not until February that he could sail again.

Capture

Admiral Juel hoisted British colours when challenged by Sappho but when ordered to stop with a warning shot replied with a broadside and hoisted the Danish colours. After half-an-hour of close action Admiral Juel surrendered to Sappho. Her sails, masts, and rigging had been shot to pieces, and two of her crew had been killed. When the news of her loss reached Denmark, conspiracy theorists were sure Jörgensen had turned traitor and deliberately sought out British warships in order to surrender his ship. Jörgensen and his crew were incarcerated on 4 March 1808 at Yarmouth prison as prisoners-of-war.

Two separate notices on the same page of the London Gazette report awards of prize money for the capture of Admiral Juuls (sic) and the presentation of accounts for the proceeds of the hull, stores, and head money.

In 1849 the Admiralty awarded the Naval General Service Medal with clasp "Sappho 2 March 1808" to the surviving claimants from HMS Sappho.

Notes

Citations

References
Danish Yachtskipper Association website
J Marcussen for a private website listing all Danish merchant ships from the year dot. Listed alphabetically (nb Æ, Ø, and Å come at the end of the Danish alphabet)
T. A. Topsøe-Jensen og Emil Marquard (1935) “Officerer i den dansk-norske Søetat 1660-1814 og den danske Søetat 1814-1932“. Two volumes. Download here.
 Danish author :da:Kay Larsen and his book Dansk Kapervæsen 1807-14", Gyldendal 1915 samt genudgivet i 1972. (Danish privateers 1807 -1814) republished 1972 (Full view is not available for this item due to copyright © restrictions) Pages 25 and 56 mention Admiral Juel but cannot be accessed on-line. Available at several libraries but none near me.(Viking)
Olsen, Claus Ib "Vi, Jörgen Jörgensen" Lindhardt og Ringhof, 2009 on Google Books. (For relevant text - click search inside)

Further reading
:no:Kaperfart - article on Norwegian Wikipedia
Article in Danish about Danish privateers 
Article Hijacking and licensing during the Napoleonic Wars. Author: Bård Frydenlund

1800s ships
Ships built in France
Captured ships
Napoleonic Wars
Privateer ships